Christian Li (born 30 October 2007) is an Australian violinist. On 20 April 2018, at age 10, he became the youngest performer to win the Yehudi Menuhin International Competition for Young Violinists in the Junior Category.

Biography 
Christian Li was born in Australia to Chinese parents. His mother, Katherine Liu, who is a first-generation immigrant from China, is an accountant. And his father, George Li, who is a second-generation Chinese born and raised in the United States, is an electrical engineer. He attended Scotch College in Hawthorn, Melbourne until early 2022. He began playing violin when he was 5 years old. As of 2020, he was studying music with Robin Wilson, head of violin at Australian National Academy of Music in Melbourne.

In June 2013, when Li had been learning to playing the violin for 8 months, he appeared in a Chinese television commercial playing his violin, along with Jacky Cheung.

In 2014, Li won first place in the Golden Beijing violin competition. In 2015, he placed first in the violin category of the Young Artist Semper Music International Competition in Italy. In 2018, he won the junior prize at the Yehudi Menuhin International Competition for Young Violinists, alongside Chloe Chua of Singapore. At age 10, he was the youngest winner in the history of the competition. In addition, he also won the Audience Prize and Composer Award in the Junior section.

In 2016, he performed at Carnegie Hall as part of the American Protégé Showcase 10th Anniversary concert. He has performed with the Australian Brandenburg Orchestra, at the Gower Festival, the Harrogate International Festival, and the Cheltenham Music Festival. In 2019, he suffered a blood nose during a centre stage performance with the Melbourne Symphony Orchestra which did not stop him from finishing his performance without a break.

In 2020 he signed with Decca Classics at the age of 12 and became the youngest musician to sign with the label; he released his first single the same year.

Discography

Studio albums

Awards and nominations

ARIA Music Awards
The ARIA Music Awards is an annual ceremony presented by Australian Recording Industry Association (ARIA), which recognises excellence, innovation, and achievement across all genres of the music of Australia. They commenced in 1987.

! 
|-
| 2021|| Vivaldi: The Four Seasons || ARIA Award for Best Classical Album || 
| 
|-

References

External links 
 

2007 births
Living people
Child classical musicians
Australian classical violinists
21st-century classical violinists
Australian people of Asian descent
Australian people of Chinese descent
Decca Records artists